William Seymour (Bill) Sewell (1 December 1951 – 29 January 2003) was a New Zealand poet. He was a Burns Fellow at Otago University, Dunedin in 1981–82. He was a frequent reviewer of books, particularly for the periodical New Zealand Books, to which he was appointed co-editor in 1997. He was also a book editor. He died of cancer in Wellington.

He published three collections of poems: Solo Flight (1982), Wheels within Wheels (1983) and Making the Far Land Glow (1986) and also A Guide to the Rimutaka Forest Park (1989). His poems have a link to modern German poetry and a political focus e.g. The Ballad of Fifty-one, about the 1951 waterfront dispute and Erebus: A Poem, about the 1979 Erebus disaster.

He was born in Athens in 1951 where his parents Rosemary Seymour and William Arthur Sewell were living at the time. His father was a former professor of English at the University of Auckland and later both his parents taught at the University of Waikato. 

He lived in Southern Europe and then England where he attended school. He studied German at the University of Auckland and lectured in German at the University of Otago. He completed a PhD on the poetry of Hans Magnus Enzensberger at the University of Otago in 1978. He had a law degree from the Victoria University of Wellington and was a legal researcher for the Law Commission.

Works
Solo Flight (1982) 
Wheels within Wheels (1983) 
Making the Far Land Glow (1986) 
A Guide to the Rimutaka Forest Park (1989)
Erebus: A Poem (1999)
The Ballad of Fifty-One (2003)

References

Further reading 

1951 births
2003 deaths
New Zealand male poets
University of Auckland alumni
Academic staff of the University of Otago
Victoria University of Wellington alumni
20th-century New Zealand poets
20th-century New Zealand male writers
21st-century New Zealand poets
Deaths from cancer in New Zealand
21st-century New Zealand male writers
University of Otago alumni